All Saints' Church, Collingham is a Grade I listed parish church in the Church of England in Collingham, Nottinghamshire.

History
The church dates from the 12th century.

It is part of a group of parishes which includes 
St Bartholomew's Church, Langford
St Giles' Church, Holme
St Cecilia's Church, Girton
All Saints' Church, Harby
St George the Martyr's Church, North & South Clifton
St John the Baptist's Church, Collingham
St Helena's Church, South Scarle
Holy Trinity Church, Besthorpe
St Helen's Church, Thorney
All Saints' Church, Winthorpe

Clock
In 1867 the church received a new turret clock by Reuben Bosworth of Nottingham. It struck the hours and the quarters. An inscription on the clock read "Presented by Mrs. Lesiter, widow of the Rev. Charles Lesiter, late vicar of this parish, May 1867".

References

Church of England church buildings in Nottinghamshire
Grade I listed churches in Nottinghamshire